Peotyle batangensis is a moth in the family Choreutidae. It was described by Aristide Caradja in 1940. It is found in Tibet.

References

Arctiidae genus list at Butterflies and Moths of the World of the Natural History Museum

Choreutidae
Moths described in 1940